Bukawa (also known as Bukaua, Kawac, Bugawac, Gawac) is an Austronesian language of Papua New Guinea.

Overview
Bukawa is spoken by about 12,000 people (in 2011) on the coast of the Huon Gulf, Morobe Province, Papua New Guinea. The most common spelling of the name in both community and government usage is Bukawa (Eckermann 2007:1), even though it comes from the Yabem language, which served as a church and school lingua franca in the coastal areas around the Gulf for most of the 20th century. This ethnonym, which now designates Bukawa-speakers in general, derives from the name of a prominent village Bugawac (literally 'River Gawac', though no such river seems to exist) at Cape Arkona in the center of the north coast.

Ethnologue notes that 40% of Bukawa speakers are monolingual (or perhaps were in 1978). This claim is hard to credit unless one discounts both Tok Pisin, the national language of Papua New Guinea, and Yabem, the local Lutheran mission lingua franca. The anthropologist Ian Hogbin, who did fieldwork in the large Bukawa-speaking village of Busama on the south coast shortly after World War II, found that everyone was multilingual in three languages: Tok Pisin, Yabem, and their village language (Hogbin 1951).

Dialects
There are four dialects. Geographical coordinates are also provided for each village.

Central-Western dialect: Buhalu, Cape Arkona, Hec, Tikeleng, Wideru villages
Eastern dialect: Bukawasip, Ulugidu villages
South-Western dialect: Asini, Busamang villages
Western dialect: Lae city villages

Phonology

Vowels 
Bukawa distinguishes the eight vowel qualities: 

  is heard as  when occurring in word-final position.

Consonants
Bukawa has the largest consonant inventory among the Austronesian languages of mainland New Guinea.

Glottal stop, written with a c as in Yabem, is only distinctive at the end of syllables. The only other consonants that can occur syllable-finally are labials and nasals: p, b, m, ŋ. Syllable-structure constraints are most easily explained if labialized and prenasalized consonants are considered unit phonemes rather than clusters. The distinction between voiced and voiceless laterals and approximants is unusual for Huon Gulf languages.

  is heard as a tap  in free variation among different speakers, but is most commonly heard as phonemic .

Tone contrasts
Vowels are further distinguished by high or low pitch. The latter is marked orthographically by a grave accent. These distinctions in tone are thus based on register tone, not contour tone as in Mandarin Chinese. Register tone contrasts are a relatively recent innovation of the North Huon Gulf languages. While tone is somewhat predictable in Yabem, where low tone correlates with voiced obstruents and high tone with voiceless obstruents, Bukawa has lost that correlation. Nor does Bukawa tone correlate predictably with Yabem tone. Compare Yabem low-tone  'woman' and Bukawa high-tone  'woman', both presumably from Proto-Oceanic (POc)  (or ).

Contrastive nasalization
Final syllables appear to show distinctive nasal contrasts. Anticipation of final nasal consonants causes final vowels to nasalize, even when the final nasal consonant is elided in actual speech. Anticipation of nonnasal codas on final syllables, on the other hand, has caused systematic stopping (postplosion) of syllable-initial nasals, creating a class of prenasalized voiced obstruents that correspond to simple nasals in Yabem, as in the final seven examples in the following table. (See Bradshaw 2010.)

Morphology

Pronouns and person markers

Free pronouns

Genitive pronouns
The short, underdifferentiated genitive forms are often disambiguated by adding the free pronoun in front.

Numerals
Traditional counting practices started with the digits of one hand, then continued on the other hand, and then the feet to reach twenty, which translates as 'one person'. Higher numbers are multiples of 'one person'. Nowadays, most counting above five is done in Tok Pisin. As in other Huon Gulf languages, the short form of the numeral 'one' functions as an indefinite article.

Names
Like most of the languages around the Huon Gulf, Bukawa has a system of birth-order names (Holzknecht 1989: 43-45). The seventh son is called "No Name":  'name-none'. Compare Numbami.

References

 Bradshaw, Joel (1997). The population kaleidoscope: Another factor in the Melanesian diversity v. Polynesian homogeneity debate. Journal of the Polynesian Society 106:222-249.
 Bradshaw, Joel (2010). Bukawa's suprasegmental journey: A review of Eckermann (2007). Oceanic Linguistics 49:580-590.
 Eckermann, W. (2007). A descriptive grammar of the Bukawa language of the Morobe Province of Papua New Guinea. Canberra: Pacific Linguistics.
 Hogbin, Ian (1951). Transformation scene: The changing culture of a New Guinea village. London: Routledge and Kegan Paul.
 Holzknecht, Susanne (1989). The Markham languages of Papua New Guinea. Series C-115. Canberra: Pacific Linguistics.

Languages of Morobe Province
North Huon Gulf languages
Tonal languages in non-tonal families